Pepsi Blue is a berry-flavored soft drink produced by PepsiCo. It was marketed as a "Berry Cola Fusion", and was sold from 2002 to 2004 in the United States and Canada. It remains available in international markets since discontinuation in the United States. It was reintroduced in the United States and Canada for a limited time beginning in May 2021.

History 

Pepsi Blue was launched in mid-2002 and discontinued in Canada and the United States in 2004, although it remains available in the Philippines. Its flavor is the result of taste-testing more than 100 flavors across 9 months. It was designed to attract teenage consumers with its bright blue color and unique flavor. The flavor was described by Pepsi only as "berry" and described by customers as similar to blueberries or raspberries, or similar to cotton candy with a berry-like aftertaste and much more sugary and syrupy than regular cola.  It was tinted using Blue 1, a highly controversial coloring agent banned in numerous countries at the time. The move to make a brightly colored version of the flagship Pepsi brand was spurred by 2001's introduction of Mountain Dew Code Red, which had bumped PepsiCo's Mountain Dew division sales up 6%, and another source noted that "Pepsi Blue attempted to imitate the lurid hues of Gatorade".

In April 2021, Pepsi announced that Pepsi Blue would be reintroduced for a limited time in May 2021.

Promotion 
Although heavily promoted by PepsiCo, including advertisements by pop singer Britney Spears and the bands Sev and Papa Roach, as well as in the movies The Italian Job and Garfield: The Movie, it is widely seen as a commercial flop as sales remained low. Even with the failure of Pepsi Blue, PepsiCo still managed to post double-digit growth.

Pepsi Blue was promoted after New York Mets games during mid 2002, where the color blue was one of the symbolic colors of the team. Other promotions included handing out free bottles from a Pepsi Blue-themed VW New Beetle at popular shopping centers around the country. Jolt Cola makes a similar beverage called Jolt Blue CX2; a blue raspberry soda in a battery-shaped metal can with a flavor often described as like that of cotton candy. Pepsi Blue was also endorsed by Adam Vinatieri, the then New England Patriots kicker, who helped the Patriots win the Super Bowl in 2002. 

In Manila, Philippines, Pepsi Blue was sold for a limited time in late 2002 to commemorate the championship of the Ateneo Blue Eagles in the UAAP. In 2011, Pepsi released  Pepsi Blue in Metro Manila, Philippines as Pepsi Pinas. After the Pepsi Pinas was successful, it became a permanent product and renamed as Pepsi Blue. It is rare in bottles and cans but common at 7-Eleven fountains there. In India, Pepsi Blue was launched during the 2003 Cricket World Cup supporting the India national cricket team, which has blue jerseys.

See also 
List of Pepsi types

References

External links

Discontinued soft drinks
PepsiCo cola brands
Products introduced in 2002